The Kortik ("dirk") close-in weapon system (CIWS) is a modern naval air defence gun-missile system deployed by the Russian Navy. Its export version is known as Kashtan (English: Chestnut), with the NATO designation CADS-N-1 Kashtan.

Typically deployed as a combined gun and missile system, it provides defence against anti-ship missiles, anti-radar missiles and guided bombs. The system can also be employed against fixed- or rotary-wing aircraft or even surface vessels such as fast attack boats or targets on shore.

The Kortik will be replaced in Russian Navy service by the Pantsir-M CIWS, which uses similar rotary cannons but different missile and radar systems.

Design
The weapon is a modular system consisting of a command module and typically two combat modules, as in the case of the two Sovremennyy-class destroyers Taizhou (ex-Vnushitelnyy) and Ningbo (ex-Vechnyy) in Chinese service, although the number can be as many as 8 in the case of Admiral Kuznetsov. The command module detects and tracks threats, distributes targeting data to the combat modules, and interrogates IFF of approaching threats. The command module has a 3-D target detection radar, and an all weather multi-band integrated control system. Depending on the number of installed combat modules, the system can engage multiple targets simultaneously.
The combat modules automatically track using either radar, electro-optronic control system (such as FLIRs) or both, and then engages targets with missiles and guns. The combat modules are typically equipped with two GSh-30K (AO-18K) six-barrel 30 mm rotary cannons, fed by a link-less feeding mechanism, and two 9M311-1 missile launchers equipped with 4 ready-to-fire missiles each and fed by a reloading system storing 32 missiles in ready-to-launch containers.

The guns used in the Kortik are the GSh-30K six-barrel 30 mm rotary cannon. Individually, each GSh-30K has a higher rate of fire compared to other guns used by other CIWS such as the GAU-8 on the Goalkeeper and the M61 Vulcan on the Phalanx. Along with a high rate of fire, the fairly heavy round used by the Kortik is comparable to the DPU rounds of the GAU-8 Avenger, although the muzzle velocity (and therefore both the kinetic energy and effective range) is slightly lower, partially offsetting the high caliber and rate of fire.

The missiles used in the Kortik are the 9M311 missiles, which is also used on the 2K22 Tunguska. The 9M311 is a SACLOS guided missile, however, it is steered automatically by the command module. The warhead weighs  and is either laser or radio fused. The warhead is a continuous-rod warhead with a steel cube fragmentation layer. The detonation of the warhead will form a complete circle of fragmentation that is 5 meters in radius, and damage or destroy anything in that circle.

The combination of the missiles and guns, provides more comprehensive protection when compared to other CIWS utilising either missiles or guns only. The system's combined kill probability is allegedly 0.96 to 0.99.

Variants
Kashtan-M: improved variant with:
Salvo capability
Dedicated targeting station
Two AO-18KD cannons with higher muzzle velocity (range improved from 4 to 5 km)
Improved missile range and engagement altitude (from 8 to 10 km for range and from 3.5 to 6 km altitude)
Decreased system's reaction time from 6.8 to 5.7 seconds
Sensor modularity
Lower weight

Specifications

Operators

Current operators

Former operators

See also
 CIWS
 KBP Instrument Design Bureau
 Tunguska-M1
Pantsir-M/EM

Notes

References

 "2001 Russian Export Arms Catalog"

External links

 30×165mm — Russian Ammunition Page
 Air Defence Missile-Gun System “KASHTAN-M”  — RATEP
 Kashtan, Kashtan-M, CADS-N-1, Palma, Palash CIWS — Navy Recognition

 Комплекс 3М87 Кортик / Каштан (SA-N-11 GRISON) — Military Russia
 "Кортик" ("Каштан", 3М87, SA-N-11, Grison) — Оружие России
 «КАШТАН - M», зенитный ракетно-артиллерийский комплекс — Оружие России
 Ракетно-артиллерийский комплекс «Каштан» — Вестник ПВО
 Ракетно-артиллерийский комплекс 3М87 «Кортик» (SA-N-11 Grison) — Вестник ПВО

Weapons of Russia
30 mm artillery
Sea radars
Rotary cannon
Close-in weapon systems
Naval anti-aircraft guns

Surface-to-air missiles of Russia
Cold War weapons of the Soviet Union
Surface-to-air missiles of the Soviet Union
KBP Instrument Design Bureau products
Tulamashzavod products
Military equipment introduced in the 1980s